XEK-AM/XHK-FM, known as La Raza, is a radio station on 960 kHz and 90.9 MHz serving the Laredo, Texas, United States and Nuevo Laredo, Tamaulipas, Mexico border area.

History

XEDF-AM was founded on May 17, 1937, by Ruperto Villarreal, who was 18 years old. It was one of the first stations in the two Laredos, originally broadcasting on 790 kHz.

In the 1950s, XEDF moved to 960. It also engaged in a callsign swap with 970 AM in Mexico City, then XEK-AM. The Mexico City station desired the XEDF calls, assigned sequentially, as the DF was the abbreviation for the Federal District. As a result, on October 22, 1957, the Nuevo Laredo station took on the XEK-AM calls. At the end of its life, it operated with 5,000 watts.

XEK was approved for AM-FM migration in 2017 as part of a second wave of stations and signed on XHK-FM 90.9 on April 7, 2018. XEK-AM signed off April 7, 2019 after the required year of simulcasting. However, on June 5, 2019, the IFT unanimously declared a continuity obligation for XEK, which according to a 2018 study left 59 people without any radio service when it signed off the air.

For decades, XEK/XHK branded as La Estación Grande de Nuevo Laredo, until December 1, 2019, when XHK became 90.9 La Raza, taking over the grupera format that had been on the Cortez family's XHBK-FM 95.7 and was supplied to that station under a five-year LMA with Latin Western Enterprises of Laredo.

References

External links
XEK official website (pre-2019)

News and talk radio stations in Mexico
Spanish-language radio stations
Radio stations in Nuevo Laredo
Radio stations in Laredo, Texas
Radio stations in Mexico with continuity obligations